"This Crazy Love" is a song written by Roger Murrah and James Dean Hicks, and recorded by American country music group The Oak Ridge Boys.  It was released in June 1987 as the second single from the album Where the Fast Lane Ends.  The song was The Oak Ridge Boys' fifteenth number one on the country chart.  The single went to number one for one week and spent a total of fifteen weeks on the country chart. It was released following the departure of William Lee Golden in March 1987.

Charts

Weekly charts

Year-end charts

References
 

1987 singles
The Oak Ridge Boys songs
Songs written by Roger Murrah
Song recordings produced by Jimmy Bowen
MCA Records singles
1987 songs
Songs written by James Dean Hicks